Van der Noot is a Dutch or Flemish surname, with several variations. Van der Noot may refer to:

 The noble family of the Count van der Noot, the current Marquess of Assche:
Philips Erard van der Noot, 13th Bishop of Ghent.
Roger-Wauthier van der Noot, 1st Baron of Carloo, mayor of Brussels.
Maximiliaan Antoon van der Noot, Bishop of Ghent.
Theodore van der Noot, 8th Marquess of Assche
Elisabeth van der Noot d'Assche, daughter of the 9th Marquess of Assche.
Henri Van der Noot (1731-1827), Belgian revolutionary and nationalist
Thomas van der Noot (1475-1525), Belgian printer and author
Thomas van der Noot (military figure) (1630-1677), Belgian soldier in the Swedish army
Dino Betti van der Noot (born 1936), an Italian jazz composer

Vandernoot may refer to:

Alexandra Vandernoot (born 1965), Belgian actress
André Vandernoot (1927–1991), Belgian conductor

See also
Van der Nootska Palace, a palace in Sweden built by Thomas van der Noot.

Dutch-language surnames
No
Surnames of Dutch origin